The 2018 ICF Canoe Sprint World Championships, the 44th edition of the World Championships, were held in Montemor-o-Velho, Portugal, from 22 to 26 August 2018.

Explanation of events
Canoe sprint competitions were contested in either a Canadian canoe (C), an open canoe with a single-blade paddle, or in a kayak (K), a closed canoe with a double-bladed paddle. Each canoe or kayak can hold one person (1), two people (2), or four people (4). For each of the specific canoes or kayaks, such as a K-1 (kayak single), the competition distances can be 200, 500, 1000 or 5000 metres. When a competition is listed as a K-2 500m event, for example, it means two people were in a kayak competing over a distance of 500 metres.

Paracanoe competitions were contested in either a va'a (V), an outrigger canoe (which includes a second pontoon) with a single-blade paddle, or in a kayak (as above). All international competitions were held over 200 metres in single-man boats, with three event classes in both types of vessel for men and women depending on the level of an athlete's impairment. The lower the classification number, the more severe the impairment is - for example, VL1 is a va'a competition for those with particularly severe impairments.

Canoe sprint

Medal table

Men's events
 Non-Olympic classes

Canoe

Kayak

Women's events
 Non-Olympic classes

Canoe

Kayak

Paracanoe

Medal table

Medal events
 Non-Paralympic classes

Notes

References

External links
Official website
International Canoe Federation

 
2018
ICF Canoe Sprint World Championships
ICF Canoe Sprint World Championships
2018 ICF Canoe Sprint World Championships
ICF Canoe Sprint World Championships
Montemor-o-Velho
2018 in disability sport